Malaysia competed at the 1988 Summer Paralympics in Seoul, South Korea. 14 competitors from Malaysia won a single bronze medal and finished 48th at the medal table.

See also
Malaysia at the Paralympics
Malaysia at the 1988 Summer Olympics

References 

Nations at the 1988 Summer Paralympics
1988
Summer Paralympics